Riccardo Zampagna (born 15 November 1974) is an Italian former footballer who played as a striker.

Playing career
After spending most of his career in the lower leagues (Serie C1, Serie C2 and D, from 2000 in the second tier), Zampagna finally debuted in Serie A with Messina. In January 2006, he signed with Atalanta B.C. (then in Serie B), achieving promotion that season, and scoring 11 times in the club's 2006–07 first division campaign.

On 19 November 2007, after displaying conduct detrimental to the team, he was suspended by coach Luigi Delneri and subsequently sold on the first day of January's transfer window, joining Vicenza (swapped with the remain 50% registration rights of Simone Padoin). In July 2008, Zampagna agreed to join newly promoted Serie B outfit Sassuolo for €1 million.

Managerial career
He was manager of lower league side Macchie from 2013 to 2014.

References

External links
http://www.gazzetta.it/speciali/serie_b/2008_nw/giocatori/54490.shtml

1974 births
Living people
Italian footballers
Serie A players
Serie B players
Atalanta B.C. players
Catania S.S.D. players
People from Terni
U.S. Triestina Calcio 1918 players
Cosenza Calcio 1914 players
A.C. Perugia Calcio players
A.C.R. Messina players
S.S. Arezzo players
Ternana Calcio players
L.R. Vicenza players
A.C.N. Siena 1904 players
U.S. Sassuolo Calcio players
Carrarese Calcio players
Footballers from Umbria

Association football forwards
Sportspeople from the Province of Terni